In-tank toilet cleaners (also known as toilet water tablets, drop-in cleaners, etc.) are tablets or cartridges that add chemicals to toilet tank water to reduce toilet bowl stains. They are commonly used to prevent toilet bowl stains from calcium, limescale, mold, etc. Most contain chlorine bleach as its main active ingredient, however some may use other main active ingredients.

History
It is originally invented by Flushco, Inc. in 1978, branded as 2000 Flushes (acquired and now owned by WD-40 Company).

Eventually, some other brands and companies such as S.C. Johnson Scrubbing Bubbles and Clorox sold their own in-tank toilet cleaner tablets. It is unknown whether or not they received license from 2000 Flushes, however they likely did .

View from professionals and plumbers
Many plumbers, manufacturer of toilets, and other professionals discouraged in-tank toilet cleaning products due to major disadvantages. A major complication that may occur includes bleach breaking down rubber gaskets and corroding steel parts. Another issue is the blue dye commonly in in-tank cleaning tablets may cover up iron deposits.

Many manufacturers of toilets have discouraged the use of in-tank cleaners by voiding warranty of toilets that are damaged from use of in-tank cleaners

References 

Cleaning products